The Brogna or Brogne is a breed of domestic sheep from the province of Verona, in the Veneto in north-eastern Italy. It is well adapted to the local upland environment. The name of the breed may derive from that of the suppressed comune of Breonio, now part of Fumane.

History

The origins of the Brogna are unknown. This area coincides with an enclave of Cimbrian language and culture, and the origins of the breed may be closely linked to those people, who arrived from Bavaria in the early thirteenth century. Alternatively, the Brogna may have originated as a composite of the Bergamasca and Lamon breeds.

The Brogna is one of the forty-two autochthonous local sheep breeds of limited distribution for which a herdbook is kept by the Associazione Nazionale della Pastorizia, the Italian national association of sheep-breeders.

The area of Verona was formerly famous for its woollen goods, but from the sixteenth century its importance began to decline. Sheep-farming became secondary to cattle-raising in the area; from about 30,000 head of sheep on the plateau in the late eighteenth century, numbers had fallen to 5334 in a census of 1881. In the early 1980s a census of the Brogna breed counted 50 head and it was considered to be close to extinction. By 1994 numbers had risen to over 4500. In 2013 total numbers for the breed were 2193.

Characteristics

Use

The Brogna was traditionally a triple-purpose breed, raised for meat, milk and wool; however the demand for wool is now low and it is raised principally for meat.

In a feeding trial of the lambs, comparing them to other regional breeds under three different feeding regimes, the Brogna was found to have more fat and better cooking qualities than the Alpagota but a slower growth rate and smaller carcase size than the Foza. All three breeds were worth preserving to provide regional products to local markets.

References

Sheep breeds originating in Italy